Patissa nigropunctata is a moth in the family Crambidae. It was described by Wileman and South in 1918. It is found in Taiwan.

The forewings of the males are white with a brownish tinge and a black spot at the lower angle of the cell. The forewings of the females are paler than those of the males. There are black spots at the upper and the lower angles of the cell.

References

Moths described in 1918
Schoenobiinae